The Sun King is a 2005 Danish comedy film directed by Tomas Villum Jensen.

Cast 
 Nikolaj Lie Kaas - Tommy
 Birthe Neumann - Susse
 Thomas Bo Larsen - Flemming Kok
 Niels Olsen - Ole Finland
 Peter Gantzler - Johannes
 Mira Wanting - Stine
  - Grethe
 Kirsten Lehfeldt - Tommys mor
 Jens Okking - Tommys far
 Ole Thestrup - Leif
 Kristian Halken - Læge

References

External links 

2005 comedy films
2005 films
Danish comedy films
Films with screenplays by Anders Thomas Jensen
2000s Danish-language films